HUSNAYN) is a village in the sub-governorate of Bariq in  the province of Asir, Saudi Arabia. It is connected with the main road by a 9.8 Kilometer.
Some events occurred in the village of Al-Husnain in Asir Governorate, when the village experienced heavy rains and torrential rains in 2016, which almost caused a disaster. In each season, the municipal council was appealed so that disaster would never be resolved.

Etymology and usage
Husnayn, is meaning, (The two towers). It was in the village Two Towers stone but Tearing Down.

See also 

 List of cities and towns in Saudi Arabia
 Regions of Saudi Arabia

References 

Populated places in 'Asir Province
Populated coastal places in Saudi Arabia
Populated places in Bareq